The 2017 UEC European Cyclo-cross Championships is the European Championship for cyclo-cross for the season 2017–18. It is holds in Tábor in Czech Republic on Sunday 5 November 2017. The championships featured five events; men's races for elite, under-23 and junior riders, and women's races for elite and under-23 riders.

Schedule
Sunday 5 November 2017
 09:00 Men's Junior
 10:15 Women's Under 23
 11:30 Men's Under 23
 13:00 Women's Elite
 14:30 Men's Elite

All times in local time (UTC+1).

Participants

Medal summary

References

External links
 

UEC Cyclo-cross European Championships, 2017
UEC European Cyclo-cross Championships
2017 in Czech sport
Cycle races in the Czech Republic
International sports competitions hosted by the Czech Republic
UEC European Cyclo-cross Championships